Samuel Ferguson was an artist and antiquary.

Samuel Ferguson may also refer to:

 Samuel David Ferguson (1842–1916), Episcopal bishop in America
 Samuel Lewis Ferguson (1869–1934), American lawyer, newspaper publisher and politician
 Samuel W. Ferguson (1834–1917), Confederate States Army general
 Champ Ferguson (1821–1865), Confederate guerrilla during the American Civil War
 Dr. Samuel Fergusson, main character in the novel Five Weeks in a Balloon by Jules Verne
 Samuel Thomas Ferguson (1871–1948), the eponymous owner of Samuel Ferguson's cottage in West Toodyay, Western Australia